Tangyuan is a traditional Chinese dessert made of glutinous rice shaped into a ball that is served in a hot broth or syrup. They come in varying sizes, anything between a marble to a ping pong ball, and are sometimes stuffed with filling. Tangyuan is traditionally eaten during the Lantern Festival, but because its name is a homophone for union and symbolizes togetherness and completeness, this dish is also served at weddings, family reunions, Chinese New Year, and the Dōngzhì (winter solstice) festival.

History
Tangyuan is traditionally eaten during the Lantern Festival, which falls on the 15th day of the first month of a lunar new year, which is the first full moon. The festival falls each year on a day in February in the International calendar. People eat Tangyuan for good luck and hopes of filling their life with sweetness and joy.

The traditional filling for Tangyuan is made from sesame, peanuts, sugar and animal fat. The Silk Road and the Maritime Silk Road enabled the exchange of goods and ideas. Sesame were imported from Central Asia during the Han Dynasty (202-220BC), and peanuts entered the country from the Philippines during the Ming Dynasty (1368-1644).

The practice of eating Tangyuan has been around for over 2,000 years, and has had several names over the years. During the Yongle era of the Ming Dynasty, it was called Yuanxiao (derived from the Yuanxiao Festival) in northern China. This name translates to "first evening", where "yuan" means round or full, and "xiao" means night. 

People in southern China called the dish Tangyuan or Tangtuan. In the Hakka and Cantonese varieties of Chinese, Tangyuan is pronounced as "tong rhen" or "tong jyun". The term tangtuan (Hakka: tong ton, Cantonese: tong tun) is not commonly used. Legend has it that during Yuan Shikai's rule from 1912 to 1916, he disliked the name yuanxiao because it sounded identical to "remove Yuan"; thus he gave orders to change the name to Tangyuan. This new moniker directly translates to "round balls in soup" or "round dumplings in soup". Nowadays, "Tangyuan" refers to the southern style, whereas "Yuanxiao" refers to the northern style. The two are primarily differentiated by their method of preparation.

Geographical differences 
Tangyuan originates from southern China, whereas people in the north call the dish, Yuanxiao. Like Tangyuan, Yuanxiao is a glutinous rice balled stuffed with filling that's eaten during the Lantern Festival and other important gatherings. Although they look alike, they are two separate things. The fundamental difference lies in their making, fillings, cooking and storage.

Yuanxiao has sweet and solid fillings and is served in a thick broth. The surface tends to be dry and soft and has a short shelf life. The process of making the dish begins with preparing the solid fillings that are then cut into small pieces. The filling is dipped into water then the dry glutinous rice flour repeatedly, until a round shape is achieved. 

Tangyuan can be stuffed with a variety of soft filling that are either sweet or salty, and is served in a thinner soup. The texture is smooth and glutinous, and can be stored frozen for a long time. Tangyuan is made by wrapping the soft filling in a glutinous rice "dough" and shaping it into a ball. The southern variation is served in a broth that changes depending on the filling. Daikon radish and fish cake broth is used for savory fillings, or tong sui, which is "sugar water," for sweeter options.

Cultural significance
For many Chinese families in mainland China as well as overseas, Tangyuan is traditionally eaten during the Lantern Festival, Chinese New Year, and gatherings with family to celebrate. Its round shape and the bowls in which they are served in holds cultural and symbolic significance, symbolizing togetherness, unity, and reunion.

Description

Tangyuan is a versatile dessert with a delicate taste and soft, chewy texture. While it can be served in its simplest form as a plain white ball of glutinous rice, it can also be stuffed, colored, fried, and boiled. The process of making Tangyuan is comparable to making dumplings: wrap the glutinous rice around the filling that is filled with lard oil and shape it into a ball with your hands. Tangyuan can either be sweet and savory, using more traditional fillings like black sesame. Sweet Tangyuan can be served in ginger-infused syrup, whereas savory Tangyuan are served in a clear soup broth. Unfilled Tangyuan are served as part of a sweet dessert soup known in Cantonese cuisine as tong sui (literally: "sugar water").

Common soup bases 
 Red bean soup
 Black sesame soup
 Ginger and rock sugar
 Fermented glutinous rice, Sweet Osmanthus and rock sugar.

While tangyuan began as a traditional delicacy eaten during festivals, it has now evolved into a dessert that is consumed year-round. As it became more widespread, different renditions are introduced to the traditional Chinese Tangyuan to cater to consumers. New fillings, shapes, and coloring of the glutinous rice are introduced; chocolate and custard fillings are substituting traditional approaches.

Sweet fillings 

 Black sesame (mixed with sugar)
 Crushed peanuts (mixed with sugar)
 Jujube paste

 Chocolate paste (softened butter mixed with cocoa powder and stirred until blended)
 Red bean paste (Azuki bean)
 Lotus seed paste
 Matcha paste
 Custard

Savory fillings 

 Crushed peanuts
 Minced meat
 Mushroom
 Cabbage

Availability
The most renowned varieties come from Ningbo in Zhejiang Province. However, they are traditionally eaten throughout China.

Tangyuan has also come to be associated with the Winter Solstice and Chinese New Year in various regions. Today, the food is eaten all year round. Mass-produced tangyuan is commonly found in the frozen food section of Asian supermarkets in China and overseas.

Variations

As the Chinese dessert spread to other regions of Asia, a variety of renditions emerged from different cultures.

China 
Yuanxiao is very similar to Tangyuan, and is often confused with each other and used interchangeably. Like Tangyuan, the dessert is a glutinous rice balled stuffed with filling that's eaten during the Lantern Festival and other important gatherings. Although they look alike, they are two separate things. The fundamental difference lies in their making, fillings, cooking and storage. Yuanxiao originates from northern China, and has sweet and solid fillings, like sesame and bean paste, and is served in a thick broth. The surface tends to be dry and soft and has a short shelf life. 

Muah Chee or  Kalochia is another similar dish that originates from southern China. It is a steamed sticky dough made of glutinous flour that is cut into small pieces and coated with sugar and finely crushed roasted peanuts or toasted sesame.

Jiandui (Chinese: 煎䭔; pinyin: jiānduī), or Sesame Balls is a variation of Tangyuan. It is made with glutinous rice flour, that is fried and coated with sesame seeds to achieve a crisp, chewy texture. The insides of the dessert is hollow and is stuffed with lotus paste, black sesame, or red bean paste.

Japan 
Japanese Daifukumochi is similar to Tangyuan. It was initially introduced from Southeast Asia during the Heian period, and is eaten during the New Year. The traditional Japanese dessert is mochi (glutinous rice) stuffed in sweet filling like anko, which is a sweetened red bean paste made from azuki beans.  While Daifukumochi is similar to Tangyuan, the preparation process is different. A process called wet milling is used to achieve its chewy texture, that is less soft than its Chinese counterpart.

Indonesia 
In Indonesia, an adapted version, called Wedang Ronde (Wedang in Javanese means beverage, and Ronde means round ball), is a popular food eaten during cold temperatures. The round colored balls of glutinous rice can be filled with crushed peanuts and sugar, or left plain and is served in a sweetened, mild ginger broth often boiled in fragrant pandan leaves. Crushed, toasted peanuts, tapioca pearls, and slices of coconut can also be added.

Malaysia 
In Malaysia, "Buah Melaka" translated as Malaccan's fruit is a dessert mainly made of glutinous rice flour which is popular among Malay Malaysians. The green pandan colored ball is sprinkled with dry coconut shavings and filled with semi-liquefied sweet "Gula Melaka" or Malaccan's sugar, a type of molasses made from palm nectar. It is enjoyed throughout the tropical summer year and usually sold by Malay street's hawkers. It is usually enjoyed during teatime and breakfast. A good accompaniment is to drink with hot Darjeeling's tea. “Buah Melaka” is most likely originated from Chinese Peranakan Baba and Nyonya recipe from Malacca, hence the name.

Myanmar (Burma) 

In Myanmar (Burma), mont lone yay baw (မုန့်လုံးရေပေါ်) is a traditional festive dish, served during Thingyan, and filled with pieces of jaggery and served with coconut shavings.

Philippines 
In the Philippines, ginataang bilo-bilò is also served in coconut milk, and sometimes local produce such as plantains (sabà), tapioca, and/or sweet potatoes are also added in. The traditional Chinese tangyuan though is usually called in Hokkien by Chinese Filipinos as "chiōng-uân-îⁿ" or "siōng-guân-îⁿ".

Thailand 
In Thailand, bua loi (บัวลอย) is a sweet glutinous rice flour balls in the coconut milk or ginger syrup.

Vietnam 
In southern Vietnam, a similar dish called chè trôi nước, is served in a mild, sweet liquid flavored with grated ginger root. In northern Vietnam, bánh trôi (also called bánh trôi nước) and bánh chay are analogous, with the latter being served with coconut milk.

See also

  (Red bean soup)
 
 
 
 List of Chinese desserts
 List of desserts
 List of dumplings

References

Chinese desserts
Chinese New Year foods
Chinese rice dishes
Dumplings
Glutinous rice dishes
Rice cakes